Kevin Francis Hart (21 April 1927 – 6 October 2016) was an Australian rules footballer who played with Fitzroy and Carlton in the Victorian Football League (VFL).

A rover, Hart played three league seasons for Fitzroy and one for Carlton.

Hart was a successful player and coach in the Diamond Valley Football League during the 1950s. He won the league's best and fairest award in 1952 and 1955 while with Mcleod, then captain-coached Heidelberg to premierships in 1956 and 1957.

References

1927 births
2016 deaths
Australian rules footballers from Victoria (Australia)
Fitzroy Football Club players
Carlton Football Club players
Heidelberg Football Club players